The Clock Tower of Haridwar, also known as the Raja Birla Tower, is a landmark freestanding clock tower, built by Raja Baldev Das Birla in 1938 in Haridwar, Uttarakhand, India. Each of its four sides has a clock, with Roman numerals representing hours and dots depicting the minutes. The structure marks a good location from which to watch the evening prayers at Har Ki Pauri. 
 
The surrounding area has been used as a media platform for the Kumbh Mela. Prior to the 2021 Kumbh Mela artist Harshvardhan Kadam painted it in red and gold murals to express Hindu mythological stories based on the writings and ideas of the Vaimānika Shāstra.

Construction
The Clock Tower of Haridwar, also known as the Raja Birla Tower and Ghantaghar, was built by Raja Baldev Das Birla of Pilani in 1938. Many clock towers were built in India before it was common in that country to own a watch.

Location and design
The tower is on Malviya Island, opposite the steps of Har Ki Pauri in Haridwar. It has four sides, each with a clock face, that use Roman numerals to represent the hours and dots to depict the minutes. The surrounding island has marble flooring, is shaped like a boat, and has its own ghat (steps) to enter the river Ganges. Until 1979 it was connected to other local bathing spots by three bridges.

The tower marks a position from which the daily evening Hindu prayers at Har Ki Pauri may be easily seen. In 2010 a platform was constructed close to the tower from which nearly 300 media personnel watched the main bathing day of the Kumbh Mela that year.

Haridwar Mural Project 
Prior to the 2021 Kumbh Mela, the artist Harshvardhan Kadam painted the tower with red and gold murals to express mythological stories based on the work and ideas of the Vaimānika Shāstra. The work was part of the Haridwar Mural Project, in collaboration with the Namami Gange Programme and art retailer Mojarto: a venture to find non-traditional platforms to display religious art in Haridwar and to safeguard the river Ganges.

Gallery

Notes

References

External links 

 

 

 

Clock towers in India
History of Haridwar
Buildings and structures in Haridwar
1938 establishments in India
Buildings and structures completed in 1938
20th-century architecture in India